Angele-Anang Pokinwuttipob, known professionally as Angele Anang, is a Thai drag performer, best known for winning the second season of Drag Race Thailand, the Thai spinoff of RuPaul's Drag Race. She was the first transgender winner in the franchise. She is known as "Beyoncé of Thailand" for her impersonation of the singer.

Early life 
Pokinwuttipob was born in Nakhon Ratchasima in 1994. After her mother died from breast cancer, she stopped studying in 8th grade. Anang had a history of drug abuse. After drug rehabilitation, she briefly became a monk.

Career
Pokinwuttipob was a successful Beyonce impersonator.  She has her first act in a transgender cabaret show in Bangkok; Calypso cabaret. After she quit the theater in 2018 she became a freelance drag performer internationally.

Pokinwuttipob was announced as one of the fourteen contestants for the second season of Drag Race Thailand, that began airing on January 11, 2019. Throughout her time in the competition, she won six challenges, more than any other queen in the franchise's history. On April 5, she was crowned the winner. She is the first of only four transgender women to win a season of the Drag Race franchise, the second being Kylie Sonique Love winning the sixth series of RuPaul's Drag Race All Stars, the third being Vanessa Van Cartier winning the second series of Drag Race Holland, and the fourth being Willow Pill winning season 14 of RuPaul's Drag Race.

In 2019, Anang spoke at DragCon NYC's "All Around the World: International Drag Queen" panel.

Anang was a featured performer of Xtra in 2020, a digital drag show created to support drag queens struggling from the economic impact of the COVID-19 pandemic. Later that year, she was a featured performer of Oaklash, which was also held virtually.

Filmography

Television

Web series

Music video

Awards and nominations

References

External links

1994 births
Living people
Angele Anang
Angele Anang
Angele Anang
Transgender women
Transgender drag performers